Wondiye Fikre Indelbu (born 13 February 1988) is a Paralympian athlete from Ethiopia competing mainly in category T46 middle distance events. He competed in the 2012 Summer Paralympics in London, England. There he won a silver medal in the men's 1500 meters - T46 event. This was Ethiopia's first Paralympics medal.

References

1988 births
Living people
Ethiopian male middle-distance runners
Paralympic silver medalists for Ethiopia
Place of birth missing (living people)
Athletes (track and field) at the 2012 Summer Paralympics
Medalists at the 2012 Summer Paralympics
Middle-distance runners with limb difference
Paralympic medalists in athletics (track and field)
Paralympic athletes of Ethiopia